St. Martin may refer to several places in Switzerland:

Saint-Martin, Fribourg, in the Canton of Fribourg
St. Martin, Graubünden, in the canton of Graubünden
Saint-Martin, Valais, in the Canton of Valais